Harish Chandra Srivastava (Harish Ji) (21 February 1925 – 18 January 2015) was an Indian politician and former Minister of Social Justice in the Government of Uttar Pradesh. He was elected to Uttar Pradesh Legislative Assembly two times from Bansi constituency of Siddharthnagar district and two times from Varanasi Cantt. constituency of Varanasi district. He also served as Minister of Food Supply and Science & Technology in Janata Party ministry from 1977 to 1979.

References

1925 births
Politicians from Varanasi
State cabinet ministers of Uttar Pradesh
2015 deaths
Members of the Uttar Pradesh Legislative Assembly
Bharatiya Janata Party politicians from Uttar Pradesh
Janata Party politicians